Acallam Bec or Agallamh Bheag ("The Little Colloquy") is the title of a medieval Irish compilation of fianaigecht tales, preserved in the fifteenth-century Book of Lismore and the Reeves manuscript. It is closely related to the Acallam na Senórach ("The Colloquy of the Elders"), of which it is sometimes considered to be a later recension. It differs from it in making Oisín rather than Caílte the principal character. Douglas Hyde has suggested that the text may preserve the lost beginning of Acallam na Senórach.

References

Editions and translations
Kuehns, Julia Sophie. An edition and translation of the Agallamh Bheag from the Book of Lismore. (2005). Unpublished MPhil(R) thesis, University of Glasgow. Full text available online.
An Craoibhín (pseudonym of Douglas Hyde) (ed. and trans.). "An Agallamh Bheag." Lia Fáil 1 (1927): 79-107. Partial edition with translation into Modern Irish. Available online from Celtic Digital Initiative
Pennington, Walter (tr.). "The Little Colloquy." Philological Quarterly 9.2 (1930): 97-110. Translation of Hyde's edition, together with which it is available online from Celtic Digital Initiative

Secondary sources
Hyde, Douglas. "The Reeves Manuscript of the Agallamh na Senorach." Revue Celtique 38 (1920): 289-95. 
Murphy, Gerard. The Ossianic Lore and Romantic Tales of Medieval Ireland. Dublin, 1955. Text Extract from 1961 edition reproduced online

Fenian Cycle
Early Irish literature
Texts of medieval Ireland
Irish books